The Ministry of Labour and Employment (Śrama ō karmasansthāna mantraṇālaẏa) is the government ministry of Bangladesh responsible for employment, to protect and safeguard the interest of workers and human resource development.

Directorates
Inspector of Factories and Establishments
Child Labour Unit
Minimum Wage Board
Department of Labour

References

 
Labour and Employment
Labour in Bangladesh
Bangladesh